This is a list of Estonian television related events from 1970.

Events

Debuts
 17 May - television series "Laulame neid laule jälle" started.

Television shows

Ending this year

Births

Deaths

See also
 1970 in Estonia

References

1970s in Estonian television